The Mobulidae (manta rays and devilfishes) are a family of rays consisting mostly of large species living in the open ocean rather than on the sea bottom.

Taxonomy
The Mobulidae have been variously considered a subfamily of the Myliobatidae by some authors, and a distinct family by others, but recent work favors the latter. Two genera have been traditionally recognized, Manta and Mobula, but recent DNA analysis shows that Mobula as traditionally recognized is paraphyletic to manta rays, making Manta a junior synonym of Mobula.

Fossil record
Several genera of fossil mobulids are known, including Archaeomanta, Burnhamia, Eomobula, and Paramobula.

References

Ray families
Myliobatiformes
Extant Cenomanian first appearances
Taxa named by Theodore Gill